"An Old Fashioned Love Song" is a 1971 song written by Paul Williams and performed by the American pop-rock band Three Dog Night. Chuck Negron performed the lead vocal on this track. Taken as the first single from their 1971 album, Harmony, the song peaked at number 4 on the Billboard Hot 100 chart in December 1971, becoming the band's seventh top-ten hit. It was Three Dog Night's first record to top the U.S. easy listening chart. It reached number 2 in Canada. Its lyrics suggest the straightforward and melodic nature of the tune: Just an old fashioned love song / Comin' down in three part harmony / Just an old fashioned love song / One I'm sure they wrote for you and me.

According to the Karen Carpenter biography Little Girl Blue by Randy L. Schmidt, Williams originally intended the song for The Carpenters, who were in the middle of a string of hits with their own brand of "old fashioned love songs", including two of Williams' own compositions, "We've Only Just Begun" and "Rainy Days and Mondays". Although this was the first song Williams had written specifically for the Carpenters, Richard Carpenter rejected it, and so Williams offered the song to Three Dog Night.  The Carpenters never recorded the song, but did perform it live on television with Carol Burnett a few months later.

Personnel 

 Michael Allsup – guitar
 Jimmy Greenspoon – keyboards
 Danny Hutton – background vocals
 Chuck Negron – lead vocals, background vocals
 Joe Schermie – bass
 Floyd Sneed – drums
 Cory Wells – background vocals

Chart performance

Weekly charts

Year-end charts

Certifications

Paul Williams version

The song's composer Paul Williams recorded his own version of the song he had written, which was included on his 1971 album Just an Old Fashioned Love Song. Williams later performed the song when he appeared on The Muppet Show in 1976. He also sang a portion of the song for an episode of The Odd Couple in 1974.

Other versions
The Ray Conniff Singers and The Sandpipers recorded and released their respective versions later in 1971.
 The New Seekers covered the song on their 1971 album We'd Like to Teach the World to Sing 
Country music singer Jeris Ross released a cover version of the song in 1972. Her rendition of the song reached number 58 on the Billboard country singles chart.
Andy Williams released a version in 1972 on his album, Love Theme from "The Godfather".
The song was also sampled in the 1999 hip-hop song "Once Again (Here to Kick One for You)" by Handsome Boy Modeling School featuring Grand Puba and Sadat X.
The intro to the song was also sampled by Chinese Man in their song "More", from the album "The Groove Sessions Volume 1" in 2007.
The Kubricks released a version in 2016 for the soundtrack of Ice Age: Collision Course.

See also
List of number-one adult contemporary singles of 1972 (U.S.)

References

External links
 

1971 singles
Songs written by Paul Williams (songwriter)
Three Dog Night songs
Andy Williams songs
1971 songs
Dunhill Records singles
A&M Records singles
Songs about music